Karatuzsky (masculine), Karatuzskaya (feminine), or Karatuzskoye (neuter) may refer to:
Karatuzsky District, a district in Krasnoyarsk Krai, Russia
Karatuzskoye, a rural locality (a selo) in Krasnoyarsk Krai, Russia